Julius Radichi (1763 – 16 September 1846) was an Austrian actor and operatic tenor.

Life 
Radichi probably came from Italy and first appeared in Milan's la Scala in 1793/94 and in Genoa in 1799. From 24 February 1808 to 31 August 1819 and from 1826 to 1829 he was a member of the Vienna Court Theatres. On 23 March 1829 he gave his farewell concert and was afterwards active as a pedagogue.

He was also an esteemed concert singer, especially in Haydn's oratorios The Creation and The Seasons.

He became particularly famous in the role of Florestan in Beethoven's Fidelio. He impersonated this part in the premiere of the third and final version, which took place on 23 March 1814 at the Theater am Kärntnertor. Previously he had also sung Florestan in Paër's Leonore, which was first performed on 8 February 1809 at the Theater am Kärntnertor in German.

Radichi last lived at Franziskanerplatz No. 911 in Vienna, where he died of old age at the age of 83.

Further reading 
 Constantin von Wurzbach: Radichi, Julius. In Biographisches Lexikon des Kaiserthums Oesterreich. 24. Theil. Kaiserlich-königliche Hof- und Staatsdruckerei, Vienna 1872,  Radichi, Julius
 Katalog der Portrait-Sammlung der k. u. k. General-Intendanz der k. k. Hoftheater. Zugleich ein biographisches Hilfsbuch auf dem Gebiet von Theater und Musik. Zweite Abtheilung. Gruppe IV. Wiener Hoftheater, Vienna 1892, 
 Alexander Wheelock Thayer, Ludwig van Beethovens Leben, edited by Hermann Deiters, volume 3, Leipzig 1917
 Willy Hess, Das Fidelio-Buch, Winterthur 1986
 Alexander Rausch: Radichi (Radicchi, Radicki), Julius (Giulio). In Oesterreichisches Musiklexikon. Vienna 2002, ; Printed edition: Volume 4, edition of the Österreichische Akademie der Wissenschaften, Vienna 2005.

References 

18th-century Austrian male actors
19th-century Austrian male actors
Austrian operatic tenors
Place of birth missing
1763 births
1846 deaths